Madhab Sardar is a politician from Odisha, India. He represented Keonjhar (Lok Sabha constituency) from the year 1996 to 1998. He is a member of Biju Janata Dal. He was previously associated with the Indian National Congress.

References

Living people
Lok Sabha members from Odisha
India MPs 1996–1997
People from Kendujhar district
Biju Janata Dal politicians
Indian National Congress politicians
Year of birth missing (living people)